Montreal was an electoral district of the Legislative Assembly of the Parliament of the Province of Canada, in Canada East. It was created in 1841 and included much of the city of Montreal.  Its boundaries were specifically drawn by the British Governor General, Lord Sydenham, to include voters of British background, disenfranchising francophone Canadien voters, an example of an ethnic and linguistic gerrymander.  Sydenham's purpose was to gain support in the Legislative Assembly for the new Province of Canada, which had merged the formerly separate provinces of Lower Canada and Upper Canada.

Montreal electoral district was represented by two members in the Legislative Assembly. It was abolished in 1867, upon the creation of Canada and the province of Quebec.

Boundaries 

The Union Act, 1840 merged the two provinces of Lower Canada and Upper Canada into the Province of Canada, with a single Parliament.  The separate parliaments of Lower Canada and Upper Canada were abolished.Union Act, 1840, 3 & 4 Vict., c. 35, s. 2.

The Union Act provided that the pre-existing electoral boundaries of Lower Canada and Upper Canada would continue to be used in the new Parliament, unless altered by the Union Act itself. Montreal was one of the electoral districts specifically defined by the Union Act.  Prior to the Union Act, the Island of Montreal was divided into three  electoral districts, called Montreal East, Montreal West, and Montreal County. The Act changed this situation by providing that the city of Montreal would be one district, but gave the Governor General the power to set the boundaries for the district.  Any parts of the city which were not included in the boundaries set by the Governor General would be included in the adjoining electoral district, namely a revised Montreal County.

The first Governor General, Lord Sydenham, exercised the power to draw boundaries by a proclamation issued shortly after the formation of the Province of Canada in early 1841.  His overall goal in drawing the boundaries was to ensure that supporters of the creation of the new Province of Canada would be elected. The boundaries did not follow the normal municipal boundaries, rather being drawn along certain streets and geographic features.  This new electoral district was designed to exclude as many francophone Canadien voters as possible, and to include as many voters of British background as possible, since they generally supported the union.  It was an example of an ethnic and linguistic gerrymander.  The areas of Montreal which were not included in the new electoral district instead were included in Montreal County.  The result was the effective disenfranchisement of Montreal francophone voters in the 1841 election.

Montreal was a multi-member seat, entitled to two members in the Legislative Assembly.

Members of the Legislative Assembly 

The following were the members of the Legislative Assembly from Montreal.

Notes

Abolition 

The district was split into two districts prior to Confederation in 1867, which were later abolished on July 1, 1867, when the British North America Act, 1867 came into force, splitting the Province of Canada into Quebec and Ontario.  It was succeeded by two electoral districts in the House of Commons of Canada, named Montreal West and Montreal East, and two electoral districts in the Legislative Assembly of Quebec, named Montréal-Ouest and Montreal-Est.

References 

Electoral districts of Canada East